Kevin Wölk (born 28 May 1985) is a German former professional football midfielder who played as a midfielder.

References

External links
 

1985 births
Living people
German footballers
Association football midfielders
Holstein Kiel II players
VfB Lübeck players
VfL Bochum II players
KSV Hessen Kassel players
Rot Weiss Ahlen players
SV Darmstadt 98 players
FSV Frankfurt players
Wormatia Worms players
3. Liga players
Regionalliga players